Khurshit Lutfullayev is a Kyrgyzstani footballer. He is a member of the Kyrgyzstan national football team. He currently play for FC Abdish-Ata Kant.

Career
By the end of the 2013 season, Lutfullayev reached the milestone of scoring at least 100 goals in Kyrgyzstan League and Cup matches.

Career statistics

International

Statistics accurate as of match played 23 May 2015

International goals

References

External links
 

Living people
Kyrgyzstani footballers
Kyrgyzstan international footballers
Kyrgyzstani expatriate footballers
1983 births
Association football forwards
Kyrgyz Premier League players
FC Abdysh-Ata Kant players